Lanrong Township is a rural township in Chengbu Miao Autonomous County, Hunan, China. The town is bordered to the north by Rulin Town, to the east by Huangjin Township of Xinning County, to the south by Guali Township of Ziyuan County, and to the west by Baimaoping Township.

Name
Legend said that someone set up a card here to intercept rhinos, so it is called "Lanniu". "Lan" means intercept and "Niu" means rhinos. In the local dialect, the pronunciation of the phrases "Lanniu" and "Lanrong" are similar, so this is origin of "Lanrong".

Administrative division
As of 2015, the township is divided into 7 villages: Jiantoutian, Xinzhai, Baomuping, Huilong, Shuiyuan, Qianfeng and Qingyun.

Geography
The township is located in the southeast of Chengbu Miao Autonomous County.

There are a number of popular mountains located immediately adjacent to the townsite which include Mount Erbaoding; Mount Fengyudian; and Mount Santianxing.

The Wushui River flows through the town north to south.

Climate
Winter is warm and summer is cold.

Demographics
In December 2015, the township had an estimated population of 8,982 and a population density of 80 persons per km2. Miao people is the dominant ethnic group in the township, accounting for 5,224, accounting for 58.16%. There are also 10 ethnic groups, such as Dong, Hui, Zhuang, and Manchu. Among them, there are 1,671 Han people (18%) and 1,557 Dong, Manchu, Hui and Zhuang people (17.33%).

Economy
The principal industries in the area are agriculture, forestry and mineral resources. The region abounds with manganese and silicon.

References

Chengbu Miao Autonomous County